Leandro may refer to:

 Leandro (given name), a male name, including a list of people with the name
 Ero e Leandro, a 1707 cantata by George Frideric Handel
 San Leandro, California
 San Leandro Creek

See also
Leandra (disambiguation)